The First Baptist Church is a historic church on Arkansas Highway 159 South,  south of Eudora, Arkansas.  The wood-frame church was built in 1900, and rebuilt in 1946 after sustaining significant storm damage.  The building is clad in a combination of weatherboard and novelty siding, and is covered by a shingled cross-gable roof.  It is topped by a short gable-roofed belltower.  The front facade is symmetrically organized around the main entrance, with the door recessed in a projecting section with its own, lower, end gable.  The double doors are flanked by three-over-one windows.  The building is associated with the African-American community that developed in the area during the first half of the 20th century.

The building was listed on the National Register of Historic Places in 1998.

See also
National Register of Historic Places listings in Chicot County, Arkansas

References

Baptist churches in Arkansas
Churches on the National Register of Historic Places in Arkansas
Churches completed in 1900
Churches in Chicot County, Arkansas
National Register of Historic Places in Chicot County, Arkansas
Churches completed in 1946
Eudora, Arkansas